The women's doubles badminton event at the 2022 Commonwealth Games was held from 4 to 8 August 2022 at the National Exhibition Centre on the Solihull, England. The defending gold medalists were Chow Mei Kuan and Vivian Hoo of Malaysia. Chow and Hoo did not defend their title.

The athletes were drawn into straight knockout stage. The draw for the competition was conducted on 28 July 2022.

Seeds 

The seeds for the tournament were:

  (Champions, Gold medalists)
  (Final, Silver medalists)

  (Quarter-finals)
  (Semi-finals, Bronze medalists)

Results

Finals

Top half

Section 1

Section 2

Bottom half

Section 3

Section 4

References 

Women's doubles